is a passenger railway station located in the city of Higashikagawa, Kagawa Prefecture, Japan. It is operated by JR Shikoku and has the station number "T11".

Lines
Sanuki-Shirotori Station is served by the JR Shikoku Kōtoku Line and is located 40.7 km from the beginning of the line at Takamatsu.

Layout
The station consists of two opposed side platforms serving two tracks. The station building is unstaffed and serves only as a waiting room. The platforms are linked by a footbridge but it is also possible to access platform 2 directly from the south entrance of the station. A bike shed is provided just outside this entrance.

History
At that time the station was operated by Japanese Government Railways, later becoming Japanese National Railways (JNR). On 15 December 1956, the reading of the station name was changed from "Sanuki-Shiratori" to "Sanuki-Shirotori" with no change in the kanji. With the privatization of JNR on 1 April 1987, control of the station passed to JR Shikoku.

Surrounding area
Higashikagawa City Hall
Kagawa Prefectural Shiratori Hospital

See also
List of railway stations in Japan

References

External links

Station timetable

Railway stations in Kagawa Prefecture
Railway stations in Japan opened in 1928
Higashikagawa, Kagawa